Hong Ji-hee (Born in Seoul July 27, 1988) is a South Korean movie, television and musical actress. She's known for her role Yoo Cho-hee, in tvN drama series Hometown Cha-Cha-Cha and Jang Hye-jin of Big Mouth.

After graduating from Department of Theater and Film of Kyunghee University, Hong debuted as musical actress in 5th season of open run musical Finding Kim Jong-wook (2011). She was actually debut as actress earlier with minor roles in film Into the White Night (2009) as Cha Young-eun, followed by another role in film City of Damnation (2009) as reporter.

Career

Musical Career 
After graduating from Department of Theater and Film of Kyunghee University, in 2011, Hong debut as musical actress. Hong first role was woman who’s looking for her first love in a famous open run musical Finding Kim Jong-wook. Hong starred alongside Kim Jae-beom, Sang Sang-yoon, Rajun, Kim Ji-hyeon, Baek Eun-hye, Lim Ki-hong, Kim Min-gun, and Lee Ju-hoon for 5th season. Season 5 director, Kim Dong-yeon introduced all casts to the public through the brand day, held in the afternoon of June 7th, 2011 in the Seoul Theater Center in Myeongnyun-dong, Jongno-gu, Seoul.

In November 2011, director Kim Dong-yeon, invited Hong to audition for his new musical Coffee Prince 1st Store, adaptation of popular television drama with the same name. However the musical storyline focused on Choi Han-gyeol and Go Eun-chan romance, closer to original source material, novel with the same name by Lee Seon-mi. Hong and Yu Joo-hye passed the audition for title role of Go Eun-chan. They acted opposite Kim Jae-beom and Kim Tae-han who performed alternately as Choi Han-gyeol. Produced by Kim So-ro Project, performance were staged at Filling Hall 1, Daehangno Cultural Space from February 24 to April 29, 2012.

Also in 2012, Hong join the musical Three Thousands — The Flower of Destruction, a historical musical that re-imagined the fall of Baekje and its last king, King Uija and his 3000 court ladies. This work portrayed King Uija as a solitary and strong person who ruled Baekje, a prosperous nation. Hong took on the role of Yeon-hwa, a blind court lady. Written and directed by Seo Yoon-mi, the musical was performed from October 26, 2012, to January 20, 2013, at the Daehangno Cultural Space Filling Hall 1.

In 2013, Hong auditioned for 13th performance of Musical Laundry that was moving to the Art One Theater with a new cast. Hong passed the auditioned for title role Son Na-young, along with two actress Kwak Sun-young and Park Eun-mi. Kim Kyung-soo and Kim Bo-gang were double cast as new Solongos, Mongolian immigrant. The musical started with a preview performance on March 13 to 14, and performance was held at Art One Theater 2 in Daehangno until September 29, 2013.

In 2014, Hong reprised her role in White Day performance of musical Finding Kim Jong-wook.

In the following year, Hong joined musical Abbocatto. It’s about singer-songwriter Yoo Jae-min and his lover aspiring writer Jeong Da-jeong, and question of whether the memories their of love would be bittersweet like wine in the abboccato stage. Written by Lee Ho-jeon and composed by Lee Jin-wook, this musical was selected for the 2014 Creative Musical Development Support Project after overcoming a 100 to 1 competition. It was first introduced in 2011 through a reading performance by CJ Creative Mind. Followed by the SMF Yegreen Encore Showcases in 2012. Hong starred as Jeong Da-jeong both in demonstration performance in Februarynand reprise her role in the re-staged at the Daemyung Cultural Factory (DCF) Hall 2 in Daehak-ro from March to April, 2015.

Also in 2015, Hong reprised the role of Son Na-young in the 10th anniversary performance of Musical Laundry  

In 2016 Hong joined cast of musical Mirror Princess Pyeonggang Story. Written by Choi Eun-i and Min Jun-ho of Ganda Theater Company, the story was based on folktale Princess Pyeonggang and On Dal.

In 2018 Hong reunited with director Kim Dong-yeon in musical Vampire Arthur. Hong took on the stage as a hopeful and pure girl Emma who makes Arthur, a vampire, dream of a new world. Followed by Sideureus (2020) and Maybe Happy Ending (2021) as Claire.

She starred as Hannah in the 2021 musical Four minutes, based on the 2006 German film 'Four minutes' directed by Chris Krauss. Hong conveyed her desperate feelings as Hannah, Kruger's same-sex lover.

Theater debut and works

After four years as musical actress, Hong wanted to challenge herself with a play. Her theater debut was 2015 play Hot Summer produced by Ganda Theater Company. Hong shared dual lead role Chae-kyung and Sa-rang with two musical actress,  and Shin Ui-jeong; who were original casts from the premiere in 2014, at the 10th anniversary of Ganda Theater Company. Written and directed by Min Jun-ho, it was performed from August 11 to November 1, 2015, at Daehangno Freedom Theater. 

In 2016, Hong worked again with director Min Jun-ho in encore performance of play Almost, Maine by John Cariani. It was back after three years and reperformed from January 8 to April 10, 2016, at Sangmyung Art Hall 1, Daehangno. Hong, youngest actress in the play, played three roles: Glory, Waitress and Gayle. In the same year, Hong acted as Mariko in the play Round Trip Letter, which was based on 2010 Ōfuku Shokan (往復書簡) by Japanese author Minato Kanae. Directed by Kim Myung-hwan, play' storyline is about longtime lovers Junichi and Mariko. They met as classmates in middle school. Junichi leaves for volunteer work to a remote island country in the South Pacific with limited electricity and communicates through letter with Mariko. Through their letters, the couple face the truth of an incident fifteen years ago. Double cast as Mariko, Hong and actress Lee Ji-hae acted opposite Park Si-beom, Kang Jung-woo, and Son Yoo-dong who were triple-cast as Junichi. Son Seong-min, Byun Hyo-joon, Choi Seok-jin, and Park Hee-jeong were cast as the multi-player roles that unlocks the clues to the truth hidden between two lovers. 

In late 2017, playwright Min Jun-ho direct his own play The 100th Debate of the New Humanity. It was based on a 100% debate on a TV show. Hong and Yoo-yeon double-cast for role Hyun Chung-hee, a parasitologist who observes and studies poisons, parasites, and viruses. Hong showed a fierce performance just like real debate professional.

In 2018, Hong challenged herself for another multi-roles as Akiko, Emiko, and Midori of Miracles of the Namiya General Store, a play based on the novel of the same name by Keigo Higashino, Japanese master of mystery novels. Back in 2016, the play was selected as one of the works of 'Performance, Meet - Accompany', a new content development support project for the 2nd anniversary of the opening of Daemyung Cultural Factory, and after the pre-reading performance, it was completed as a main performance after an additional development period.

Screen debut and works 
In 2009, Hong made her feature film debut with a small role opposite Son Ye-jin in Park Shin-woo's film Into the White Night (2009) as Cha Young-eun.  Hong's second film role was as reporter in the bombing site the 2009 film City of Damnation.. She was more focus on building her career on stage afterwards. After almost a decade after her debut in big screen, in 2018, Hong back with independent film Daughters Table. Directed by Son Hee-song, the film depict the story about there daughters of Ms. Jo, Su-yeon, Ji-yeon and So-yeon who lives a busy lives. They back to their Hometown upon hearing the News that their Mother is dying.

Her first television role was in 2019 KBS drama series Unasked Family. Hong played Trần Thị Trang, a Vietnamese housekeeper who fell in love with the eldest son of a famous Korean restaurant. Hong was showing perfect acting skills, with accent of  a Vietnamese who learned Korean, viewers even think that She was really a Vietnamese. In the same year Hong joined tvN drama series Arthdal Chronicles as Hae Ga-on.

In 2021, Hong's portrayal as Yoo Cho-hee, a teacher at Cheongjin Elementary School, in tvN drama series Hometown Cha-Cha-Cha, was received well by viewers. In 2022, Hong participated in drama Big Mouth as Jang Hye-jin.

Musical Comeback 
In 2022 Hong participated in premiere of the creative musical Let me fly with the role of Park Jeong-bun. Jeongbun is a 19-year-old girl who lives in the countryside and dreams of going to the moon. the creative musical Let me fly directed by Lee Dae-woong, with producers Hong Yun-kyung and Lee Young-chan, written and lyricist Jo Min-hyung, written and arranged by Min Chan-hong.

Filmographies

Film

Television shows

Stage

Musical

Theater

Note

References

External links 
 
 
 Hong Ji-hee at Daum Encyclopedia 
 Hong Ji-hee at PlayDB 
 Hong Ji-hee at Naver 

Living people
1988 births
Kyung Hee University alumni
South Korean film actresses
South Korean musical theatre actresses
South Korean stage actresses
South Korean television actresses
21st-century South Korean actresses